Ernst Uthoff Biefang (1904-1993) was a German-born Chilean ballet dancer, choreographer, and director. He danced for Kurt Jooss's company alongside his future wife, Lola Botka, and Rudolf Pescht. In 1945, the trio co-founded the Chilean National Ballet. Uthoff won the National Prize of Art of Chile in 1984.

References

1904 births
1993 deaths
People from Duisburg
German emigrants to Chile
German male ballet dancers
Chilean male ballet dancers
Ballet choreographers
German choreographers
20th-century German ballet dancers